c2c (legal name Trenitalia c2c Limited) is a British train operating company owned by Trenitalia that operates the Essex Thameside railway contract. It manages 25 stations and its trains call at 28. c2c provides commuter services from its  terminus to parts of East London and south Essex along the London, Tilbury and Southend line.

The company began operating as LTS Rail in May 1996 under the ownership of Prism Rail, which had been awarded the London, Tilbury & Southend railway franchise as part of the privatisation of British Rail. LTS Rail rebranded as c2c in 2000 and Prism Rail was bought by National Express later that year. National Express was awarded a second franchise in 2014. It sold c2c to the Italian operator Trenitalia in February 2017. The service has been run as a rail contract since 19 July 2021.

History

First franchise (1996–2014)

LTS Rail
The London, Tilbury and Southend franchise was created as part of the privatisation of British Rail. In December 1995 the franchise was awarded to a management buyout and handover was due to happen on 4 February 1996. However, on 1 February 1996 ticketing and settlement irregularities were discovered and the other shortlisted bidders were invited to tender again. In May 1996, the franchise was awarded to Prism Rail by the Director of Passenger Rail Franchising for 15 years. It began operating as LTS Rail on 26 May 1996. The franchise period could be reduced to seven years if the operator did not fulfil bid commitments to replace rolling stock with new trains.

Passenger numbers increased above forecasts which caused overcrowding as trains reached capacity at peak times. In 1998 the franchise was renegotiated to provide for the elimination of slam-door rolling stock and increased fleet by March 2002, increased staffing of stations, real-time passenger information system, improved security measures, improved station facilities for disabled people, increased cycle storage and pedestrian access from Chafford Hundred railway station to Lakeside Shopping Centre.

LTS Rail started serving West Ham station from 14 May 1999 to coincide with the opening of the Jubilee line extension. Peak services were restricted at West Ham, because of limitations of the signalling system. These were eliminated in time for the December 2011 timetable change ahead of the 2012 Summer Olympics.

The business was rebranded as c2c on 2 July 2000. To coincide with the rebranding, the company website was launched on 16 June 2000. The company name was changed from LTS Rail Limited to c2c Rail Limited.

National Express
In July 2000, c2c was included in the sale of Prism Rail to National Express. The merger of the companies was completed on 19 September 2000. National Express combined the management and support functions of c2c, Silverlink, WAGN and Stansted Express in a single organisation called London Lines in March 2001.

Fenchurch Street station management transferred from c2c to Network Rail in March 2002.

In January 2005, it was announced that an on-train television service would be tried out, and one unit had television installed. In June 2006, the 360 On-Board Television service ran into financial difficulties when c2c's partner in the project, TNCI (UK), ceased trading, and the service was withdrawn. c2c indicated it would restart the roll-out should a suitable partner be found.

In June 2006, it was announced that portable X-ray machines and metal detectors would be randomly placed at stations and carried by officers on trains during summer 2006 to catch people carrying weapons, in a joint operation with Essex Police and British Transport Police, following trials at London Underground stations.

A peak timetable introduced on 11 December 2006, with the aim of improving services for the Thurrock and London Riverside sections of the Thames Gateway, was withdrawn on 8 January 2007 after a campaign by passengers as a result of delays and cancellations that affected other lines on the network. c2c agreed in 2006 to work with Passenger Focus to establish a passenger panel.

In October 2007, c2c announced that the first coach of each unit would be made a Quiet Zone, where passengers are asked not to use their mobile phones or play music out loud. The Quiet Zone was introduced in early 2008 and is indicated by magenta vinyl stickers on the doors of the coach.

In October 2007, c2c announced that it had switched to renewably-generated electricity in all its stations, maintenance facilities and offices in a contract with E.ON UK, said to be the largest of its kind in the transport sector.

The franchise was originally due to conclude on 26 May 2011. In December 2010, the Department for Transport (DfT) granted National Express an extension until 26 May 2013 to allow DfT time to conduct a review of the franchising process. In March 2013, the Secretary of State for Transport announced the franchise would again be extended until 13 September 2014. A further delay saw this extended until 8 November 2014.

Second franchise  (2014–2021)
On 9 November 2014, National Express was awarded the new 15-year Essex Thameside franchise, having successfully tendered against Abellio, FirstGroup and MTR Corporation. The c2c brand was retained for the new operator, NXET Trains Limited, which replaced c2c Rail Limited. Management of Fenchurch Street station transferred from Network Rail to c2c.

In December 2015, c2c introduced a new timetable to reflect long-term changes in passenger numbers at stations on the line. Consultation responses to the draft timetable published in October 2014 indicated dissatisfaction with many of the proposed changes. c2c was criticised for putting the interests of "one-stop hoppers" (passengers travelling between Barking and West Ham) above those who travel further on the line.

Trenitalia
In February 2017 National Express sold c2c to Trenitalia. c2c was the only remaining National Express operated UK rail franchise, down from a peak of nine in 2003. The company name was changed to Trenitalia c2c Limited.

On 1 April 2017, c2c introduced a new on-board WiFi service free to all customers. Also, it has an on-board entertainment service called Vista. c2c has partnered with Now TV to provide free television shows available to stream for c2c passengers.

During the summer of 2019 c2c ran an hourly weekend limited stop service between Fenchurch Street and Shoeburyess. The new service coincided with the weekend extension of Fenchurch Street to Southend Central via Ockendon trains to Shoeburyness, providing a seven trains per hour service between Shoeburyness and Benfleet on Saturdays and a five trains per hour service on Sundays.

In September 2019 it was announced that c2c had invested more than £10million into a new self service ticketing system with a user-friendly self-service interface developed with Voodoo Park. The interface is completely web-based and can be remotely repaired. The ticket machines installed in 2019 are from the Italian company Sigma Spa.

On 23 September 2019, c2c announced that it would be removing the first-to-last staffing at some stations and reducing ticket-office opening hours.

On 31 March 2020 Trenitalia and the Department for Transport entered into an emergency measures agreement to vary the terms of the franchise agreement during the COVID-19 pandemic. This took effect on 1 April 2020 and lasted until 20 September 2020. On 19 September 2020 Trenitalia and the Department for Transport entered into an emergency recovery measures agreement. This was a precursor to the replacement of the franchise agreement with a rail contract.

Rail contract (2021–present)
On 19 July 2021 the franchise agreement was replaced with a rail contract, which expires on 23 July 2023.

The timetable was amended in May 2022 to accommodate the London Overground extension to Barking Riverside,  the extension having started running in July 2022 as a spur from the Tilbury loop line east of Barking, sharing infrastructure with c2c services.

c2c is one of several train operators impacted by the 2022–2023 United Kingdom railway strikes, which was the first national rail strike in the UK for three decades. Its workers are amongst those who are participating in industrial action owing to a dispute over pay and working conditions.

Branding and marketing

The c2c name could be conceived to represent "city to coast" or "capital to coast", reflecting the nature of the route, or "commitment to customers".

The c2c website stated:

National Express also referred to the c2c route as City to Coast. c2c used the slogan "way2go", but later used the "Making travel simpler" slogan also used by other National Express companies.

Services

Routes
The main line operates via Basildon with a loop line via Tilbury and a branch line via Ockendon. c2c trains connect Central London with East London and the northern Thames Gateway area of southern Essex. As of the December 2022 timetable, the main route from Fenchurch Street to Shoeburyness has a fastest timetabled journey of 58 minutes, although this is achieved by only a few trains in the peak. To meet a 2014 franchise commitment, since the December 2015 timetable change most services between Fenchurch Street and Barking at peak times call at all stations, including Limehouse and West Ham.

London terminus

, c2c runs two London–Shoeburyness services an hour at weekends that instead of calling at West Ham, Limehouse and Fenchurch Street are diverted from Barking to Stratford and Liverpool Street. This enables c2c passengers to access Westfield Stratford City and the London Stadium directly. The alternative route is also used when engineering work or disruption blocks access to Fenchurch Street. This route runs over part of the London Overground Gospel Oak to Barking line and the Elizabeth line. c2c trains pass through Maryland, Forest Gate and Woodgrange Park stations without stopping.

Stations
c2c serves a total of 28 stations. 25 of the stations are managed by c2c. West Ham and Stratford stations are managed by the London Underground and Liverpool Street station is managed by Network Rail. There are interchanges with the London Underground District line at Fenchurch Street (via out of station transfer with Tower Hill), West Ham, Barking and Upminster. The Circle line has interchanges at Liverpool Street and Fenchurch Street (via Tower Hill). The Hammersmith and City line has interchanges at Liverpool Street, West Ham and Barking. The Jubilee line has interchanges at West Ham and Stratford. The Central line has interchanges at Liverpool Street and Stratford. The Docklands Light Railway has interchanges at Fenchurch Street (via Tower Gateway), Limehouse, Stratford and West Ham. The Elizabeth line has interchanges at Liverpool Street and Stratford. The London Overground has interchanges at Liverpool Street, Stratford, Barking and Upminster.

Timetable
 the off-peak service Monday–Friday is as follows:

Future services
Beam Park Station, a new station, will eventually become part of the c2c Network, between Dagenham Dock and Rainham.

Ticketing
c2c has issued tickets for travel to National Rail ITSO smartcards branded 'c2c Smart' since 3 November 2014.

Through historic agreement there is interavailable ticketing with the London Underground between Fenchurch Street/Tower Hill and Upminster, with the fares set by Transport for London. Since January 2004 the pay-as-you-go product on Oyster card has been available at stations between Fenchurch Street/Liverpool Street and Upminster. It was extended to Dagenham Dock and Rainham in 2008. In January 2010 it was extended to Chafford Hundred, Grays, Ockendon and Purfleet. Pay-as-you-go payment by contactless bank card or smartphone is available at all stations between Fenchurch Street/Liverpool Street and Grays.

Rolling stock

Slam-door replacement

LTS Rail inherited a fleet of slam-door electric multiple unit Class 302, Class 310 and Class 312 trainsets from Network SouthEast. The original franchise agreement was for 25 sliding door trainsets (consisting of 100 carriages) to be transferred from West Anglia Great Northern (WAGN) and for 44 new trains (consisting of 176 carriages) to be ordered by the company. LTS Rail ordered 44 Class 357 Electrostar units in 1997, to be leased from Porterbrook. The most elderly Class 302 units were removed from regular service on 4 July 1998, with some sets retained as spares in case of stock shortages. By November 1998, WAGN had released 17 Class 317 units. However, both companies were experiencing an unexpected increase in passenger numbers and WAGN was unable to release more vehicles.

The franchise agreement was renegotiated in November 1998 to replace the entire LTS Rail fleet with new vehicles, allowing for the return of the Class 317s to WAGN and the planned elimination of slam-door stock by March 2002. The first Class 357 train was delivered in 1999. A second batch of 28 Class 357 units was ordered in December 1999, 
to be leased from Angel Trains. This satisfied a franchise commitment to increase the fleet by 3 units. Reliability problems with the new trains led to their withdrawal from service at peak times in October 2000. By way of compensation, two additional units were added to the first order for free by the supplier Adtranz. In 2003, c2c became the first train operating company to have replaced its entire fleet with new accessible trains. The last slam-door Class 312 service ran on 29 March 2003.

In March 2007, after extensive trials, c2c began fitting regenerative braking to its fleet, becoming the first UK train operator to do so. On 3 June 2007, the eve of World Environment Day, one train was given an all-over green vinyl sticker livery with the slogan "All c2c trains are greener now – find out more at – www.c2c-online.co.uk – c2c – the greener way to go" to highlight the completion of the scheme, which the company says has enabled energy savings of up to 20%.

With a few Class 357s being out of service at the same time, from late 2006 two Class 321s were hired from Silverlink for three months for weekday peak-hour use between Fenchurch Street and Laindon, and Pitsea via Rainham, to cover for the unavailable units.

In June 2009, Bombardier began repainting the Class 357 units. The vinyl wraps carrying the original purplish blue and magenta c2c livery were removed and the units reliveried in white with dark blue doors. The last blue liveried train ran on 5 March 2011.

Overcrowding relief

As part of the new 2014 franchise, c2c committed to leasing new trains to cope with rising passenger numbers, which were boosted especially by the opening of the Docklands Light Railway station at West Ham in 2011 and the rise of Canary Wharf as a financial centre.

The Class 357 trains had been introduced with high density 3+2 seating, consisting of 282 seats and space for 124 standing, giving a total capacity of 406 passengers per four carriage unit. In late 2015 c2c adapted 20% of its carriages into a "Metro" configuration with seats removed around doorways and in the aisle to provide a 2+2 layout. The Metro configuration consists of 222 seats, space for 334 standing, and a total passenger capacity of 556 per four carriage unit. In the evening peak, these passengers can displace those eastbound passengers who use more easterly and less well-served stations.

In early 2016, c2c announced that it would lease additional trains to relieve overcrowding. This led to its leasing six Class 387s for three years from Porterbrook to increase capacity on the busiest services. The first entered service in November 2016.

Current fleet
The c2c fleet is maintained at East Ham Depot and Shoeburyness Depot.

Future fleet
In December 2017, c2c announced an order with Porterbrook for six ten-car Class 720/6 Aventra electric multiple units. The new units are scheduled for delivery between mid and late 2021, meaning they will all be in service three years earlier than the initial planned phased introduction period. The first 720/6 was delivered to c2c on 19 April 2022, and the fleet was due to enter service in 2022.

The order was later changed to 12 5-car units. These new units were planned to replace the allocation of six four-car  units, which c2c was operating on a short-term lease.

On 6 October 2022, the Southend Echo newspaper quoted a c2c spokesman as saying that "Our 720 class trains are currently undergoing rigorous testing. We will update our customers as soon as we have more information as to when they will be entering passenger service on the c2c route.”

Former fleet
Below is a table of former units operated by c2c.

Performance
As of 31 March 2022, the statistical performance of c2c is as follows. Between April 2021 and March 2022, there were 28.1 million passenger journeys (up from 15 million in 2020/2021 and down from 47.3 million in 2019/2020). Passengers travelled 622 million kilometres in 2021/22 (up from 329 million kilometres in 2020/2021 and down from 1,201 million kilometres in 2019/2020). In 2021/2022 trains travelled in service for 6 million kilometres (unchanged from 2020/2021 and down from 7.2 million kilometres in 2019/2020). There were 104,283 trains planned to run in service in 2021/2022 (up from 101,145 in 2020/2021 and down from 123,355 in 2019/2020). The percentage of trains on time in 2021/2022 was 83.4% (down from 84.9% in 2020/2021 and up from 82.5% in 2019/2020). 1.3% of planned services were cancelled in 2021/2022 (up from 1.0% in 2020/2021 and down from 1.6% in 2019/2020). c2c has 633.4 full-time equivalent employees (lowest level over the last five years). c2c operates on 125.5 kilometres of route (unchanged). c2c manages 25 stations (unchanged).

References

External links

Ferrovie dello Stato Italiane
National Express companies
Railway companies established in 1996
Railway operators in London
Train operating companies in the United Kingdom
Transport in Thurrock
1996 establishments in England